A wood scribe is a tool for marking wood by scratching the surface visibly. A wood scribe is often used with a try square for accurate scribing. A marking gauge is a more specific form of wood scribe used to accurately mark wood for cutting, often for laying out mortise and tenon joints.

See also
Scratch awl
Scriber
Marking knife
Marking gauge

References

Woodworking tools
Woodworking hand tools